A cope is a type of religious garment.

Cope may also refer to:

Places
 Cope, Colorado, an unincorporated community
 Cope, Indiana, an unincorporated community
 Cope, South Carolina, a town
 Mount Cope (Antarctica), Ross Dependency
 Mount Cope (Victoria), in the Australian Alps
 Cope Hill, Marie Byrd Land, Antarctica

Music
 Cope (Freeland album), by British DJ Adam Freeland
 Cope (Manchester Orchestra album) and its title track
 "Cope" (song), a song by Gigolo Aunts

Schools
 Cope Middle School (Louisiana), Bossier City
 Cope Middle School, Redlands Unified School District, Redlands, California

Other uses
 Cadena COPE, a Spanish radio station
 Cope Bros & Co, a British tobacco company, 1848-1952
 Cope (surname), several people surnamed Cope
 Cope baronets
 The Cope, or the Templecrone Agricultural Co-operative Society, a co-operative retail chain in Ireland
 Cope and drag, the top half of a mold used in sand casting
 Cope (film), a 2007 film
 Congress of the People

See also
 Cape (disambiguation)
 COPE (disambiguation)
 Coping (disambiguation)
 Copeland (disambiguation)
 Cope's rule, an evolutionary principle
 Copenhagen (tobacco), an American chewing tobacco brand
 El Copé, a town in the Coclé province of Panama